The Acrothoracica are an infraclass of barnacles.

Acrothoracicans bore into calcareous material such as mollusc shells, coral, crinoids or hardgrounds, producing a slit-like hole in the surface known by the trace fossil name Rogerella. Acrothoracicans are typically smaller than other types of barnacle, being only a few millimetres in length. Being protected by the hard surfaces into which they have bored, they have no solid carapace of plates like other barnacles but have a soft, sac-like body fixed to the surface by a chitinous disc at the front of the head. They have from four to six pairs of feathery limbs, or "cirri", which they project out of their borings to catch drifting detritus for food. The mouthparts consist of mandibles, maxillules and maxillae. One pair of cirri is close to these while the others are at the other end of the body.

Each individual acrothoracican is either male or female. A dwarf male is sometimes found attached to the mantle or wall of a female's burrow. The developing larva may omit the nauplius stage but always has a cyprid stage. This has chitinous teeth which are used after the larva has settled to abrade the surface and commence a burrow.

Two orders, three families, 11 genera and 63 species are recognized, and many more species probably remain to be identified.

References

Barnacles